The Ultralight Design Atos Trike is a Czech electric and gasoline powered ultralight trike, designed and produced by Ultralight Design SRO of Cvikov. The aircraft is supplied complete and ready-to-fly.

Design and development

The aircraft design features a cantilever A-I-R Atos rigid hang glider-style high-wing, weight-shift controls, a single-seat open cockpit with a cockpit fairing, tricycle landing gear and a single electric or piston engine in pusher configuration.

The aircraft fuselage is made from composites, with its double surface Atos wing made from carbon-fiber-reinforced polymer. The wing is supported by a single post, has a small horizontal tailplane and uses an "A" frame weight-shift control bar. The powerplant is a FlyEngine F200 piston engine or, optionally, a Flytec HPD electric motor.

Operational history
In reviewing the design in 2015, Dimitri Delemarle wrote, "Any trike specifically designed to motorize the fabulous Atos wing has to be a bit special and this machine does not disappoint...It is not cheap, but the price reflects the high-quality workmanship!"

Specifications (Atos Trike)

References

External links

Atos Trike
2010s Czech sport aircraft
2010s Czech ultralight aircraft
Single-engined pusher aircraft
Ultralight trikes
Electric aircraft